Oreste Cioni (born 13 February 1913 in Telgate, died 1968 in Terni) was an Italian footballer. He played his whole career with Ternana. He made his debut in 1932–1933 season, while his club was playing in I Divisione. He began to play regularly only from 1939–1940 season, in Serie C. He played until 1947–1948 season in Serie B.

After five years, when Ternana was fallen in Promozione, he became player-manager of the team. The following year he remained only as a manager and won the promotion in Serie D. He managed Ternana in two other seasons, 1960–1961 in Serie D and 1965–1966 in Serie C, both times taking over the place.

With 37 goals scored he is the 7th all time scorer for Ternana.

Career
1932-1948  Ternana 149 (37) 
1952-1953  Ternana 1 (0)

Manager career
1952-1954  Ternana  
1960-1961  Ternana  
1965-1966  Ternana

External links
 

1913 births
1968 deaths
Italian footballers
Ternana Calcio players
Association footballers not categorized by position